Bahrain participated in the 2018 Asian Games in Jakarta and Palembang, Indonesia from 18 August to 2 September 2018. Bahrain first competed at the Asian Games in 1982 Delhi, and has collected 58 medals in all - 25 gold, 17 silver, and 16 bronze until the last Games in 2014 Incheon.

The chef de mission of the team, Bader Nasser, was the country's flag bearer during the opening ceremony.

Medalists

The following Bahrain competitors won medals at the Games.

Competitors 
The following is a list of the number of competitors representing Bahrain that participated at the Games:

Athletics

Bowling 

Men

Cycling

Road

Track

Pursuit

Omnium

Equestrian 

Jumping

# – indicates that the score of this rider does not count in the team competition, since only the best three results of a team are counted.

Football 

Bahrain national men's team drawn in group E at the Games.

Summary

Men's tournament 

Roster

Group E

Round of 16

Handball 

Bahrain men's team entered the competition and join in group D.

Summary

Men's tournament

Roster

Ali Merza
Hasan Al-Samahiji
Isa Ahmed
Mahmood Salman
Mohamed Abdulredha
Mohamed Merza Ali
Mohamed Ali
Bilal Askani
Hasan Madan
Husain Mohamed
Komail Mahfoodh
Jasim Al-Salatna
Salman Ali
Hasan Al-Fardan
Mohamed Ahmed
Husain Al-Sayyad

Group D

Main round (Group II)

Semifinal

Gold medal game

Ju-jitsu 

Bahrain entered the ju-jitsu competition with 5 men's athletes.

Men

Sailing 

Men

Sambo

Shooting 

Bahrain has including seven shooters (3 men's and 4 women's) under coach Thanin Thaislilp, Iordan Mitov and Valeriy Timokhinto to compete at the Games.

Men

Women

Taekwondo 

Kyorugi

Triathlon 

Bahrain triathletes competed in the individual event at the Games.

Individual

Wrestling 

Bahrain wrestler Adam Batirov will participate in freestyle −74 kg event.

Men's freestyle

References

Nations at the 2018 Asian Games
2018
Asian Games